The 2023 United States Mixed Doubles Curling Championship were held from February 28 to March 5, 2023, at the Wings Event Center in Kalamazoo, Michigan. The championship featured sixteen teams, split into two pools of eight teams. After a round-robin within each pool, the top three teams from each pool advanced to a single-elimination playoff bracket.

The winning team will represent the United States at the 2023 World Mixed Doubles Curling Championship in Gangneung, South Korea.

Teams
The teams competing in the 2023 championship were:

References

United States National Curling Championships
Curling in Michigan
United States Mixed Doubles Curling Championship
2023 in sports in Michigan
Curling
Curling
United States 2023
Sports competitions in Kalamazoo, Michigan